Founded in 1998, the same year as MP3.com, MP3 Newswire is the oldest active news site devoted to digital media technology. Notable for its series of essays that chronicled the rise of digital music and the Internet’s acrimonious relationship with the record industry, MP3 Newswire initially was started to review and report on the latest products and technological advances. But opinion pieces were few and far between in the pre and early Napster days and MP3 Newswire filled the gap.

The site drew some of the earliest discourse from the digerati as columnists wrote about the birth and death of Napster, the post-Napster rise of file trading, the evolution of the digital music portable, the dominance of the iPod, the struggles of Internet radio, digital rights management, the record industry legal battles, and the ongoing attempts to interpret copyright law on the Net.  Writers include the site’s editor Richard Menta, Jon Newton of P2pnet, George Ziemann, Michael Geist, Thomas Mennecke of Slyck.com, Russell McOrmond of Digital Copyright Canada, Colin Stoner and Helen McGovern.

Yahoo Internet Life named MP3 Newswire one if its “50 Most Incredibly Useful Sites” in its July 2002 issue. MP3 Newswire was also among the sites named Best of the Internet by PC Magazine in 2004.

External links
 MP3NewsWire.net
 MP3 Newswire Turns 10. How it Started Part I and Part II - Details the formation and earliest days of MP3 Newswire

Notes 

American music websites
Digital audio
MP3